The insulin/IGF/relaxin family is a group of evolutionary related proteins which possess a variety of hormonal activities. Family members in human include two subfamilies:

1) insulin and insulin-like growth factors

2) relaxin family peptides: 
 relaxins 1 and 2
 relaxin 3
 Leydig cell-specific insulin-like peptide (gene INSL3)
 early placenta insulin-like peptide (ELIP) (gene INSL4)
 insulin-like peptide 5 (gene INSL5)
 insulin-like peptide 6

Structure
These proteins are characterized by having three disulfide bonds in a characteristic motif.  Some family members have an additional disulfide bond also in a conserved location.  All of these proteins have a helical segment (corresponding to B chain in insulin) followed by a variable-length chain, followed by a domain (A chain in insulin) with two helices pinned against each other via a disulfide bond.  These two regions are linked by two or three disulfide bonds.

Amongst the different proteins in the family, very little of the sequence is conserved except for the disulfide bonds.  The variable-length chains may exhibit large inter-species variation even when the remainder of the sequence is highly conserved; and as is in the case of insulin, sometimes the variable length chain is cleaved out by secretory endoproteases, leaving a two-chain protein held together by disulfide bonds.

See also
 Relaxin/insulin-like family peptide receptor 1

References

Protein domains